Siegen may refer to:

 Siegen
 Siegen, Bas-Rhin
 Siegen Formation, a geologic formation in Germany

See also
 Nassau-Siegen, a principality within the Holy Roman Empire